Haseko Corporation is developing the Hoakalei Resort on  in West Oahu, Hawaii. The fully entitled project being built on former sugar cane lands in 'Ewa Beach is expected to be completed by 2016. Its first component – the Ernie Els-designed golf course at Hoakalei Country Club – opened to members in January 2009.

Meaning of Hoakalei
Hoakalei means "reflection of a lei" and comes from a Hawaiian legend about the volcano goddess Pele and her sister Hi'iaka's journey across the island chain to retrieve Pele's lover Lohiau. In the story, Hi'iaka crossed the 'Ewa Plain and came to see a reflection of herself in a spring while adorned with garlands of lehua blossoms (thus the "reflection of a lei" translation). The entire story has also recently been translated into English by Puakea Nogelmeier in a 500-page hardcover volume titled Ka Mo‘olelo O Hi‘iakaikapoliopele (The Epic Tale Of Hi‘iakaikapoliopele).

Resort amenities
The vision for Hoakalei includes a hotel, resort spa, wellness center, resort residences, a waterfront commercial district, and Ernie Els’ first signature golf course in Hawaii.

See also 
 Golf glossary

Buildings and structures in Honolulu County, Hawaii
Resorts in Hawaii